Duquette is a French-origin surname. There are several variants, some more common amongst French Canadians. It is uncommon as a given name.

People with the name or its variants include:

 Dan Duquette (born 1958)), American baseball executive
 Elzear Duquette (b.?), Canadian walker 
 Gérard Duquet (1909–1986), Canadian politician
 Jim Duquette (b.?), American baseball executive
 Joseph Duquet (1815–1838), notary in Lower Canada
 Léonie Duquet (1916–1977), French nun
 Lon Milo DuQuette (born 1948), American writer, lecturer, and occultist
 Steve Duquette (b.?), American cartoonist
 Tony Duquette (1914–1999), designer for stage and film
Duche
 Jacob Duché (1737–1798), American colonist, chaplain to the Continental Congress
 Jacob Duché Sr. (1708–1788), American colonist, mayor of colonial Philadelphia

References